Big Difference was a Russian parody TV show. Conceptually it is similar to the MADtv show or the German comedy show, Switch. Created by producers Aleksandr Tsekalo and Ruslan Sorokin in 2007. The actors within the project are performing parodies of the most popular Russian and world celebrities, TV programs, movies, etc.

In 2012, the show was rebranded to Big Difference TV and one of the hosts, Ivan Urgant, was contracted by the Russian competing channel TNT to leave the show.

The show ended in 2014.

History 
The first episode was broadcast on January 1, 2008 on Channel One Russia. Three more episodes were created because of the audience's approval. After hiatus TV show resumed in September 2008. On June 5, 2014, the last episode of the project was released.

Hosts 
 Ivan Urgant
 Aleksandr Tsekalo

Actors 
 Nonna Grishayeva
 Aleksandr Oleshko
 Sergey Burunov
 Igor Kistol
 Svetlana Galka
 Vladimir Kisarov
 Valentina Rubtsova
 Vyacheslav Manucharov
 Maria Zykova
 Vladimir Zhukov
 Aleksandr Lobanov
 Galina Konshina
 Viktor Andriyenko
 Aleksey Fedotov
 Maria Slastyonkova
 Dmitry Malashenko
 Inga Ilyushina
 Igor Afanasyev
 Andrey Barinov

Former actors 
 Fyodor Dobronravov
 Eduard Radzyukevich
 Mikhail Politseymako
 Olga Medynich

Authors 
 Ruslan Sorokin
 Maxim Tukhanin
 Vitaly Kolomiets
 Alexey Alexandrov
 Alexey Poymanov

Headings

Little difference 
"Little difference" (Russian: Malenkaya raznitsa) is heading, in which little children are performing in the parodies.

Little actors:
 Ivan Chuvatkin
 Yeryoma Cherevko
 Pavel Artyomov
 Yegor Fadeyev

Sketch with star 
"Sketch with star" (Russian: Sketch so zvezdoy) is heading, in which guest stars are playing in sketches together with the actors. Currently named "World history" (Russian: Vsemirnaya istoriya), in which guest stars play different historic figures.

Guest stars:
 Gosha Kutsenko (film actor)
 Mikhail Yefremov (film actor)
 Semyon Slepakov (TV producer)
 Mikhail Trukhin (film actor)
 Ksenia Sobchak (TV presenter)
 Filipp Kirkorov (singer)
 Aleksandr Tsekalo
 Aleksandr Samoylenko (film actor)
 Tatiana Orlova (film actress)

Animated painting 
"Animated painting" (Russian: Ozhivshaya kartina) is heading, in which actors play characters from well-known paintings.

International editions 
The Ukrainian version of Big Difference has been produced since January 1, 2010. January 1, 2011 is the expected date for the release of a Belorussian version.

Notes

External links
 The Official site

2008 Russian television series debuts
2014 Russian television series endings
2000s Russian television series
Russian satirical television shows
Channel One Russia original programming
Television series by Sreda